Anita Yuen Wah Lee; born 21 May 1968 is a Hong Kong-Canadian actress, radio host and YouTuber.

She attended Yaumati Catholic Primary School and Pentecostal School.

In 1986, she was admitted to the Hong Kong Academy for Performing Arts. She later dropped out because she was recruited by TVB to become an actress. She starred in more than 40 television series and movies in Hong Kong and Taiwan.

After she moved to Canada, she became a radio host and worked for CJVB for 15 years. During the Hong Kong anti-extradition bill protests, her radio programme was abruptly cancelled. It was speculated that she was dismissed because she had aired the song "Glory to Hong Kong".

On 3 September 2020, Lee started her own YouTube channel "移加李婉華".

Personal life 
She met a Canadian stockbroker in mid-2001, and got married in Canada in June 2003. They gave birth to a daughter in 2003 and twin brothers in October 2009.

Filmography

Film

Television

References

External links 
 
 

1968 births
Living people
Hong Kong emigrants to Canada
Hong Kong film actresses
Hong Kong television actresses
TVB actors